Dieng temples is the group of 7th and/or eighth century Hindu candi or temple compounds located in Dieng Plateau, near Banjarnegara, Central Java, Indonesia. These edifices originate from the Kalingga Kingdom.  The plateau is home of eight small Hindu temples that are among the oldest surviving religious structures ever built in Java, and the earliest Hindu temples in Indonesia.  The temples show many features of Indian Hindu temple architecture.

The real name of the temples, the history and the king responsible for the construction of these temples ware unknown. This is because the scarcity of data and inscription connected to the construction of these temples. The local Javanese population named each temples according to Javanese wayang characters, mostly taken from Mahabharata epic.

The Kailasa museum nearby contains many pieces of sculpture removed from the temples.

History 

It is unclear when they were built, and were estimated to range from mid 7th century to end of 8th century CE; they are the oldest known standing stone structures in Central Java.  They are originally thought to have numbered 400 but only eight remain after local farmers removed stone following the draining of the lake in the 19th century.

Examining the Javanese temple architectural styles, archaeologist grouped the Dieng temples within the Northern Central Javanese style, together with Gedong Songo temples, and to some extents also includes the East Javanese Badut temple, and West Javanese Cangkuang and Bojongmenje temple, and suggested that all of these temples are built within the same period, ranges from 7th to 8th century. An inscription discovered near Arjuna temple in Dieng was dated circa 808-809 CE, it was the oldest surviving specimen of old Javanese script, which revealed that the Dieng temple is continuously inhabited from mid 7th to early 9th century.

The Dieng temples was rediscovered in 1814 by a visiting British soldier that spotted temples ruin lies in the middle of a lake. At that time the plain surrounding Arjuna cluster was flooded with water and forming small lake. In 1856, Isidore van Kinsbergen led an effort to drain the lake in order to reveal the temples. The Dutch East Indies Government continued the reconstruction project in 1864, followed by further study and photographs taken by Van Kinsbergen. The temples are now believed to have been named after the heroes of the Hindu epic Mahabharata.

Temple compound 
The temples are clustered around three groups; Arjuna, Dwarawati and Gatotkaca clusters, while Bima temple was constructed as a separate single temple.

Arjuna cluster 
The main temples compound clustered around the Arjuna temple in the plain surrounded by mountains and hills. Arjuna cluster located in the central area of Dieng plateau, consisting of four temples that lined elongated in north-south direction. Arjuna temple is located at the north end, then successively to the south is the Srikandi, Puntadewa and Sembadra temple. Right in front of Arjuna temple stands Semar temple. The four temples in this cluster are facing west, except for Semar temple that facing east right in the opposite of Arjuna temple. This temple compound is the most intact compared to the other temple group clustered in the Dieng area.

 Arjuna temple Compared to other temples, the Arjuna temple is quite intact with complete reconstruction of roof section.  Photographs from the 19th century show that the top levels had fallen down. 
 Semar temple
 Srikandi temple
 Puntadewa temple
 Sembadra temple

Gatotkaca cluster 
Gatotkaca group also consists of five temples; the Gatotkaca, Setyaki, Nakula, Sadewa, and Gareng temples. Today only Gatotkaca temple remain stands, other four temples are fallen into ruin.
 Gatotkaca temple

Dwarawati cluster 
Dwarawati group consisted of four temples, namely Dwarawati, Abiyasa, Pandu, and Margasari temple. However, currently only Dwarawati that remain relatively intact, the rest are in ruins. 
 Dwarawati temple

Bima temple 
 
Bima temple is a single temple situated on a hill separated from the rest of Dieng temples. This temple is the largest and tallest building in the Dieng temple compound. The shape is different from temples in Central Java in general, and the other temples at this site, and relates more closely to Indian temples. In particular it has been compared to the Parashurameshvara Temple (c. 650) in Bhubaneswar, Odisha, and the very different temple at Bhitargaon. The 7th-century Laxman Temple at Sirpur is closer.

The temple base has a square ground-plan, the facade on each side are slightly protruding out. The front facade  protrudes about 1.5 m, serves as a porch before entering the temple's main chamber. Facades on the other three sides forming niches where originally statues or images were stored, currently all niches are empty.

The roof of the temple consists of 5 levels, with each level are decreasing in size upward. Each level is decorated with lotus double seam and gavaksha or kudu niches. These are "window"-shaped arches common as a motif in Hindu temple architecture.  Here each contains a head looking out. Such ornaments also can be found in other Javanese temples, such as Kalasan, Gebang and Merak temple. The pinnacle of the roof is missing and its original form is unknown.  There are amalaka-type segmented rings at the corners at one level, and the ornament with corbels, leaves and festoons on the lower cornices, below the gavakshas, suggest influence from Chinese Buddhist art.

Architecture 
The temples are small shrines built as monuments to the god-ancestors and dedicated to Shiva. The Hindu shrines are miniature cosmic mountains based on plans in Indian religious texts, although Schoppert suggests that though the plans follow Indian texts, the ornament has "design motifs which for the most part have no clear correlate in India".  In 2011, in a review published by Romain, the temples were related to Dravida and Pallava style temples of South India.

The temples all have a single chamber inside, with one entrance, sometimes extended to make a small vestibule. The chambers are raised on plinths, and a cornice outside indicates their height inside.  There is (or in some cases was) a high superstructure rising above the chamber, for which a variety of Indian forms are used in different temples.

Early North Central Javanese temple architecture is noted for its smaller size, simplicity and relatively lack of ornaments compared to richly decorated and massive temples of Southern Central Java, such as Kalasan, Sewu, and Prambanan. The temples of North Central Java are grouped in irregular clusters, with individual variations of temples styles. This is in contrast to concentric mandala plan of Southern Central Java temples with uniform design of perwara (ancillary) temples.

The earliest architectural usage of the Javanese kala demonic masks and makara marine monsters are exhibited along the niches and doorways of the remaining structures.

The Dieng structures were small and relatively plain, but stone architecture developed substantially in only a matter of decades resulting in masterpieces such as the Prambanan complex and Borobudur.

Gallery

Location 
Dieng's misty location almost 2,093 m above sea level, its poisonous effusions and sulphur-coloured lakes make it a particularly auspicious place for religious tribute.  The theory that poisonous effusions make it auspicious is now disputed as volcanic activity in this area from 7th to 9th century is yet to established, and records suggest the temple was abandoned after volcanic eruptions became common in central Java.

See also 
 

 Dieng Volcanic Complex
 Candi of Indonesia
 Indonesian architecture

References

Bibliography 
 Backshall, Stephan et al. (1999) Indonesia The Rough Guide London Penguin  pp. 190–195
 Dalton, Bill Indonesia Handbook fourth edition pp. 280–283
 Dumarcay, J and Miksic J. Temples of the Dieng Plateau  in Miksic, John N. 1996  (editor) 1996 Ancient History Volume 1 of Indonesian Heritage Series Archipleago Press, Singapore. 
 Michell, George, (1977) The Hindu Temple: An Introduction to its Meaning and Forms". pp. 160–161. University of Chicago Press. 
 

7th-century Hindu temples
Hindu temples in Indonesia
Archaeological sites in Indonesia
Cultural Properties of Indonesia in Central Java